The Joint Terrorism Analysis Centre (JTAC) is an all-source intelligence organisation closely related to the United Kingdom Security Service which provides advice to the British government and firms within the Critical National Infrastructure on terrorist threats.

Operating from Thames House on Millbank in central London, it provides regular assessments to  government departments, major companies and institutions, predominantly in the transport, financial services, utilities and telecommunications industries.

Organisation

The Director of JTAC reports to the Director General of the Security Service (commonly known as MI5), and directs a staff including personnel from the Security Service, Secret Intelligence Service (commonly known as MI6), Government Communications Headquarters (GCHQ), Defence Intelligence Staff, Counter Terrorism Policing and a further six government departments. Personnel are seconded to JTAC but remain under the authority of their parent organisations.

As a body closely related to the Security Service, JTAC is bound by the provisions of the  Intelligence Services Act 1994 and is subject to the oversight of the Intelligence and Security Committee.

Dissemination of information

Assessments are used to inform the threat levels disseminated through the Security Service, Home Office and  Ministry of Defence. Until very recently these threat levels were promulgated in a form known as the BIKINI state and Tesseral State.  The current threat system is similar to, and largely aligned with, the US Department of Homeland Security rating system.

Threat levels

The range of five available threat levels is:
Low – an attack is unlikely
Moderate – an attack is possible, but not likely
Substantial – an attack is a strong possibility
Severe – an attack is highly likely
Critical – an attack is expected imminently

This is a reduction from the previous seven levels in order to simplify communication to the general public.

Public attention

JTAC rose to public prominence following the terrorist attacks in London in July 2005. Media reporting highlighted a reduction in the threat level from "Severe General" to "Substantial" based on the assessment that the risk of an attack was at its lowest point since 9/11. These news reports were the first release of threat gradings outside the Critical National Infrastructure.

See also
 British intelligence agencies
 Counter-terrorism
 Threat level (disambiguation)
 National Counterterrorism Center (NCTC) – a similar body in the United States

References 
 (pdf)

External links 
 The UK's Threat Level System, MI5 website
 Current threat level, Home Office website
 Joint Terrorism Analysis Centre, MI5 website

National law enforcement agencies of the United Kingdom
British intelligence agencies
Counterterrorism in the United Kingdom
Emergency management in the United Kingdom